Tauriko is a suburb of Tauranga, in the Bay of Plenty Region of New Zealand's North Island.

According to Place Names of New Zealand by A. W. Reed and Peter Dowling, "Tauriko" is not a Māori name—the suburb was originally named Taurico after the Tauranga Rimu Company, with the spelling apparently altered to give the semblance of a Māori name.

Demographics
The statistical area will cover a larger area for the 2023 census as Tauranga's boundaries expand.

Tauriko had a population of 177 at the 2018 New Zealand census, a decrease of 39 people (−18.1%) since the 2013 census, and a decrease of 18 people (−9.2%) since the 2006 census. There were 60 households, comprising 96 males and 81 females, giving a sex ratio of 1.19 males per female. The median age was 37.6 years (compared with 37.4 years nationally), with 33 people (18.6%) aged under 15 years, 39 (22.0%) aged 15 to 29, 99 (55.9%) aged 30 to 64, and 9 (5.1%) aged 65 or older.

Ethnicities were 91.5% European/Pākehā, 18.6% Māori, 1.7% Pacific peoples, and 1.7% Asian. People may identify with more than one ethnicity.

The percentage of people born overseas was 10.2, compared with 27.1% nationally.

Although some people chose not to answer the census's question about religious affiliation, 59.3% had no religion, 33.9% were Christian, 1.7% had Māori religious beliefs, and 1.7% were Hindu.

Of those at least 15 years old, 12 (8.3%) people had a bachelor's or higher degree, and 24 (16.7%) people had no formal qualifications. The median income was $38,200, compared with $31,800 nationally. 21 people (14.6%) earned over $70,000 compared to 17.2% nationally. The employment status of those at least 15 was that 84 (58.3%) people were employed full-time, 27 (18.8%) were part-time, and 3 (2.1%) were unemployed.

Education

References

Suburbs of Tauranga